Rudno is a village and municipality in Turčianske Teplice District in the Žilina Region of northern central Slovakia.

History
In historical records, the village was first mentioned in 1343.

Geography
It has a population of about 227 people.

References

External links
https://web.archive.org/web/20070513023228/http://www.statistics.sk/mosmis/eng/run.html

Villages and municipalities in Turčianske Teplice District